The men's 90 kg judo competition at the 2016 Summer Paralympics was held on 10 September at Carioca Arena 3.

Results

Repechage

References

Official results

External links
 

M90
Judo at the Summer Paralympics Men's Middleweight